HMS Victory is a 104-gun first-rate ship of the line of the Royal Navy, ordered in 1758, laid down in 1759 and launched in 1765. She is best known for her role as Lord Nelson's flagship at the Battle of Trafalgar on 21 October 1805.

She additionally served as Keppel's flagship at Ushant, Howe's flagship at Cape Spartel and Jervis's flagship at Cape St Vincent. After 1824, she was relegated to the role of harbour ship.

In 1922, she was moved to a dry dock at Portsmouth, England, and preserved as a museum ship.

Construction
In December 1758, William Pitt the Elder, in his role as head of the British government, placed an order for the building of 12 ships, including a first-rate ship that would become Victory. During the 18th century, Victory was one of ten first-rate ships to be constructed. She was designed to carry at least 100 guns. The commissioner of Chatham Dockyard was instructed to prepare a dry dock for the construction. The Master Shipwright in charge of construction was Edward Allin, son of Sir Joseph Allin, former Surveyor of the Navy. The keel was laid on 23 July 1759 in the Old Single Dock (since renamed No. 2 Dock and now Victory Dock), and a name, Victory, was chosen in October 1760. In 1759, the Seven Years' War was going well for Britain; land victories had been won at Quebec and Minden and naval battles had been won at Lagos and Quiberon Bay. It was the Annus Mirabilis, or Wonderful Year, and the ship's name may have been chosen to commemorate the victories or it may have been chosen simply because out of the seven names shortlisted, Victory was the only one not in use. There were some doubts whether this was a suitable name since the previous  had been lost with all hands in 1744.

A team of 150 workmen were assigned to construct Victorys frame. Around 6,000 trees were used in her construction, of which 90% were oak and the remainder elm, pine and fir, together with a small quantity of lignum vitae. The wood of the hull was held in place by six-foot copper bolts, supported by treenails for the smaller fittings. Once the ship's frame had been built, it was normal to cover it up and leave it for several months to allow the wood to dry out or "season". The end of the Seven Years' War meant that Victory remained in this condition for nearly three years, which helped her subsequent longevity. Work restarted in autumn 1763 and she was floated on 7 May 1765, having cost £63,176 and 3 shillings, the equivalent of £ today.

On the day of the launch, shipwright Hartly Larkin, designated "foreman afloat" for the event, suddenly realised that the ship might not fit through the dock gates. Measurements at first light confirmed his fears: the gates were at least 9½ inches too narrow. He told the news to his superior, master shipwright John Allin, who considered abandoning the launch. Larkin asked for the assistance of every available shipwright, and they hewed away enough wood from the gates with their adzes for the ship to pass safely through. The first of these problems was rectified after launch by increasing the ship's ballast to settle her upright on the keel. The second problem, regarding the siting of the lower gunports, could not be rectified. Instead it was noted in Victorys sailing instructions that these gunports would have to remain closed and unusable in rough weather. This had potential to limit Victorys firepower, though in practice none of her subsequent actions would be fought in rough seas.

Because there was no immediate use for her, she was placed in ordinary and moored in the River Medway. Internal fitting out continued over the next four years, and sea trials were completed in 1769, after which she was returned to her Medway berth. She remained there until France joined the American War of Independence in 1778. Victory was now placed in active service as part of a general mobilisation against the French threat. This included arming her with a full complement of smooth bore, cast iron cannon. Her weaponry was intended to be thirty 42-pounders (19 kg) on her lower deck, twenty-eight 24-pounder long guns (11 kg) on her middle deck, and thirty 12-pounders (5 kg) on her upper deck, together with twelve 6-pounders on her quarterdeck and forecastle. In May 1778, the 42-pounders were replaced by 32-pounders (15 kg), but the 42-pounders were reinstated in April 1779; however, there were insufficient 42-pounders available and these were replaced with 32-pounder cannon once again.

Early service

First battle of Ushant

Victory was commissioned (put on active duty) in March 1778 under Captain Sir John Lindsay. He held that position until May 1778, when Admiral Augustus Keppel made her his flagship, and appointed Rear Admiral John Campbell (1st Captain) and Captain Jonathan Faulknor (2nd Captain). Keppel put to sea from Spithead on 9 July 1778 with a force of around twenty-nine ships of the line and, on 23 July, sighted a French fleet of roughly equal force 100 miles (160 km) west of Ushant. The French admiral, Louis Guillouet, comte d'Orvilliers, who had orders to avoid battle, was cut off from Brest, but retained the weather gage. Maneuvering was made difficult by changing winds and driving rain, but eventually a battle became inevitable, with the British more or less in column and the French in some confusion. However, the French managed to pass along the British line with their most advanced ships. The British van escaped with little loss, but Sir Hugh Palliser's rear division suffered considerably. Keppel made the signal to follow the French, but Palliser did not conform, and the action was not resumed. Keppel was court martialed and cleared and Palliser criticized by an inquiry before the affair turned into a political argument.

Second Battle of Ushant

In March 1780, Victorys hull was sheathed with 3,923 sheets of copper below the waterline to protect it against shipworm. On 2 December 1781, the ship, now commanded by Captain Henry Cromwell and bearing the flag of Rear Admiral Richard Kempenfelt, sailed with eleven other ships of the line, a 50-gun fourth-rate, and five frigates, to intercept a French convoy that had sailed from Brest on 10 December. Not knowing that the convoy was protected by twenty-one ships of the line under the command of Luc Urbain de Bouexic, comte de Guichen, Kempenfelt ordered a chase when they were sighted on 12 December and began the battle. When he noted the French superiority, he contented himself with capturing fifteen sail of the convoy. The French were dispersed in a gale and forced to return home.

Siege of Gibraltar

Victorys armament was slightly upgraded in 1782 with the replacement of all of her 6-pounders with 12-pounder cannon. Later, she also carried two carronade guns, firing 68-lb (31 kg) round shot.

In October 1782, Victory under Admiral Richard Howe was the fleet flagship of a powerful escort flotilla for a convoy of transports which resupplied Gibraltar in the event of a blockade by the French and Spanish navies. No resistance was encountered on entering the straits and the supplies were successfully unloaded. There was a minor engagement at the time of departure, in which Victory did not fire a shot. The British ships were under orders to return home and did so without major incident.

Battle of Cape St. Vincent

In 1796, Captain Robert Calder (First Captain) and Captain George Grey (Second Captain), commanded Victory under Admiral Sir John Jervis's flag. By the end of 1796, the British position in the Mediterranean had become untenable. Jervis had stationed his fleet off Cape St Vincent to prevent the Spanish from sailing north, whilst Horatio Nelson was to oversee the evacuation of Elba. Once the evacuation had been accomplished, Nelson, in HMS Minerve, sailed for Gibraltar. On learning that the Spanish fleet had passed by some days previous, Nelson left to rendezvous with Jervis on 11 February. The Spanish fleet, which had been blown off course by easterly gales, was that night working its way to Cadiz. The darkness and a dense fog meant Nelson was able to pass through the enemy fleet without being spotted and join Jervis on 13 February. Jervis, whose fleet had been reinforced on 5 February by five ships from Britain under Rear-Admiral William Parker, now had 15 ships of the line. The following morning, having drawn up his fleet into two columns, Jervis impressed upon the officers on Victorys quarterdeck how, "A victory to England is very essential at the moment". Jervis was not aware of the size of the fleet he was facing, but at around 0630 hours, received word that five Spanish warships were to the south-east. By 0900 hours the first enemy ships were visible from Victorys masthead, and at 1100 hours, Jervis gave the order to form line of battle. As the Spanish ships became visible to him, Calder reported the numbers to Jervis, but when he reached 27, Jervis replied, "Enough, Sir. No more of that. The die is cast and if there are 50 sail, I will go through them". The Spanish were caught by surprise, sailing in two divisions with a gap that Jervis aimed to exploit. The ship's log records how Victory halted the Spanish division, raking ships both ahead and astern, while Jervis' private memoirs recall how Victorys broadside so terrified Principe de Asturias that she "squared her yards, ran clear out of the battle and did not return". Jervis, realising that the main bulk of the enemy fleet could now cross astern and reunite, ordered his ships to change course, but Sir Charles Thompson, leading the rear division, failed to comply. The following ships were now in a quandary over whether to obey the Admiral's signal or follow their divisional commander. The British fleet not only achieved its main objective, that of preventing the Spanish from joining their French and Dutch allies in the channel, but also captured four ships. The dead and wounded from these four ships alone amounted to 261 and 342, respectively; more than the total number of British casualties of 73 dead and 327 wounded. There was one fatality aboard Victory; a cannonball narrowly missed Jervis and decapitated a nearby sailor.

Reconstruction

On her return to England, Victory was examined for seaworthiness and found to have significant weaknesses in her stern timbers. She was declared unfit for active service and left anchored off Chatham Dockyard. In December 1798 she was ordered to be converted to a hospital ship to hold wounded French and Spanish prisoners of war.

However, on 8 October 1799,  was lost off Chichester, having run aground on her way back to Portsmouth after escorting a convoy to Lisbon. She could not be refloated and so was stripped and dismantled. Now short of a three-decked ship of the line, the Admiralty decided to recondition Victory. Work started in 1800, but as it proceeded, an increasing number of defects were found and the repairs developed into a very extensive reconstruction. The original estimate was £23,500, but the final cost was £70,933.
Extra gun ports were added, taking her from 100 guns to 104, and her magazine lined with copper. The open galleries along her stern were removed; her figurehead was replaced along with her masts and the paint scheme changed from red to the black and yellow seen today. Her gun ports were originally yellow to match the hull, but later repainted black, giving a pattern later called the "Nelson chequer", which was adopted by most Royal Navy ships in the decade following the Battle of Trafalgar. The work was completed in April 1803, and the ship left for Portsmouth the following month under her new captain, Samuel Sutton.

Nelson and Trafalgar

Vice-Admiral Nelson hoisted his flag in Victory on 18 May 1803, with Samuel Sutton as his flag captain. The Dispatches and Letters of Vice Admiral Lord Nelson (Volume 5, page 68) record that "Friday 20 May a.m. ... Nelson ... came on board. Saturday 21st (i.e.the afternoon of the 20th) Unmoored ship and weighed. Made sail out of Spithead ... when H.M.Ship Amphion joined, and proceeded to sea in company with us" – Victory's Log. Victory was under orders to meet up with Cornwallis off Brest, but after 24 hours of searching failed to find him. The Dispatches and Letters (see above) record on page 71 "Tuesday 24 May (i.e. 23 May p.m.) Hove to at 7.40, Out Boats. The Admiral shifted his flag to the Amphion. At 7.50 Lord Nelson came on board the Amphion and hoisted his flag and made sail – Log."

On 28 May, Captain Sutton captured the French  of 32 guns, bound for Rochefort. Victory rejoined Lord Nelson off Toulon, where on 31 July, Captain Sutton exchanged commands with the captain of Amphion, Thomas Masterman Hardy and Nelson raised his flag in Victory once more.

Victory was passing the island of Toro, near Majorca, on 4 April 1805, when  brought the news that the French fleet under Pierre-Charles Villeneuve had escaped from Toulon. While Nelson made for Sicily to see if the French were heading for Egypt, Villeneuve was entering Cádiz to link up with the Spanish fleet. On 9 May, Nelson received news from  that Villeneuve had left Cadiz a month earlier. The British fleet completed their stores in Lagos Bay, Portugal and, on 11 May, sailed westward with ten ships and three frigates in pursuit of the combined Franco-Spanish fleet of 17 ships. They arrived in the West Indies to find that the enemy was sailing back to Europe, where Napoleon Bonaparte was waiting for them with his invasion forces at Boulogne.

The Franco-Spanish fleet was involved in the indecisive Battle of Cape Finisterre in fog off Ferrol with Admiral Sir Robert Calder's squadron on 22 July, before taking refuge in Vigo and Ferrol. Calder on 14 August and Nelson on 15 August joined Admiral Cornwallis's Channel Fleet off Ushant. Nelson continued on to England in Victory, leaving his Mediterranean fleet with Cornwallis who detached twenty of his thirty-three ships of the line and sent them under Calder to find the combined fleet at Ferrol. On 19 August came the worrying news that the enemy had sailed from there, followed by relief when they arrived in Cádiz two days later. On the evening of Saturday, 28 September, Lord Nelson joined Lord Collingwood's fleet off Cádiz, quietly, so that his presence would not be known.

Battle of Trafalgar

After learning he was to be removed from command, Villeneuve put to sea on the morning of 19 October and when the last ship had left port, around noon the following day, he set sail for the Mediterranean. The British frigates, which had been sent to keep track of the enemy fleet throughout the night, were spotted at around 1900 hours and the order was given to form line of battle. On the morning of 21 October, the main British fleet, which was out of sight and sailing parallel some 10 miles away, turned to intercept. Nelson had already made his plans: to break the enemy line some two or three ships ahead of their commander-in-chief in the centre and achieve victory before the van could come to their aid. At 0600 hours, Nelson ordered his fleet into two columns. 

Fitful winds made it a slow business, and for more than six hours, the two columns of British ships slowly approached the French line before , leading the lee column, was able to open fire on Fougueux. Around 30 minutes later, Victory broke the line between the 80-gun French flagship Bucentaure and 74 gun Redoutable and fired her guns at such close range that the flames of the guns were singeing the windows of the French flagship before the shockwave and cannonballs arrived. The Victory's port guns unleashed a devastating broadside, raking the Bucentaure and blowing a hole in the ship described as "large enough to drive a coach and four horses through." The maelstrom of cannonballs and grapeshot dismounted the Bucentaure's guns and shredded her crew, killing and wounding somewhere between 300 and 450 men of the ship's 750- to 800-man complement in a matter of seconds, putting the French flagship out of action. At a quarter past one, Nelson was shot, the fatal musket ball entering his left shoulder and lodging in his spine. He died at half past four. Such killing had taken place on Victory's quarter deck that Redoutable attempted to board her, but they were thwarted by the arrival of Eliab Harvey in the 98-gun , whose broadside devastated the French ship. Nelson's last order was for the fleet to anchor, but this was countermanded by Vice Admiral Cuthbert Collingwood. Victory suffered 57 killed and 102 wounded.

Victory had been badly damaged in the battle and was not able to move under her own sail.  therefore towed her to Gibraltar for repairs. Victory then carried Nelson's body to England, where, after lying in state at Greenwich, he was buried in St. Paul's Cathedral on 9 January 1806.

After Trafalgar

Final years afloat

The Admiralty Board considered Victory too old, and in too great a disrepair, to be restored as a first-rate ship of the line. In November 1807 she was relegated to second-rate, with the removal of two 32-pounder cannon and replacement of her middle deck 24-pounders with 18-pounders obtained from other laid-up ships. She was recommissioned as a troopship between December 1810 and April 1811. In 1812 she was relocated to the mouth of Portsmouth Harbour off Gosport, for service as a floating depot and, from 1813 to 1817, as a prison ship.

Major repairs were undertaken in 1814, including the fitting of  metal braces along the inside of her hull, to strengthen the timbers. This was the first use of iron in the vessel structure, other than small bolts and nails. Active service was resumed from February 1817 when she was relisted as a first-rate carrying 104 guns. However, her condition remained poor, and in January 1822 she was towed into dry dock at Portsmouth for repairs to her hull. Refloated in January 1824, she was designated as the Port admiral's flagship for Portsmouth Harbour, remaining in this role until April 1830.

Victorian era

In 1831 the Admiralty issued orders for Victory to be broken up and her timbers reused in other vessels. A public outcry against the destruction of so famous a ship led to the order being held in abeyance and Victory was left, largely forgotten, at a Portsmouth mooring. The Admiralty officially designated the ageing vessel as a tender for the port admirals flagship , and permitted civilian visitors to come aboard for tours. The ship briefly returned to the public gaze on 18 July 1833 when the queen in waiting, Princess Victoria, and her mother, the Duchess of Kent, made a visit to her quarterdeck to meet with veterans of the Trafalgar campaign. This generated a surge of interest in the vessel, and an increase in civilian visitor numbers to between 10,000 and 12,000 a year. Victoria returned for a second visit on 21 October 1844, creating a further burst of interest that lifted annual visitors to more than 22,000. In late April 1854, Victory sprang a leak and sank. All on board were rescued and the ship was subsequently raised. In 1887 she sprang a catastrophic leak and it was only with some difficulty that she was prevented from sinking at her mooring. The Admiralty thereafter provided a small annual subsidy for maintenance, and in 1889 Victory became the home of a signal school in addition to being a tender.

The impact of so much human traffic also left her increasingly decrepit, particularly in the absence of Admiralty funding for repairs. Sir Edward Seymour visited the vessel in 1886 as flag captain to the Commander-in-Chief, Portsmouth and recalled in 1911 "a more rotten ship than she had become probably never flew the pennant. I could literally run my walking stick through her sides in many places."

Despite her reuse as a school, Victory continued to deteriorate at her mooring. Emergency repairs prevented her from sinking, but Admiralty again proposed that she be scrapped and it was only the personal intervention of Edward VII that prevented this from occurring. Interest in the ship revived in 1905 when, as part of the centenary celebrations of the Battle of Trafalgar, she was decorated with electric lights powered by a submarine moored alongside. In 1910, the Society for Nautical Research was created to try to preserve her for future generations, but the Admiralty was unable to help, having become embroiled in an escalating arms race; thus by the time Frank H. Mason published The Book of British Ships in 1911, Victorys condition was described as "..nothing short of an insult". A few glimpses of the ship in 1918 are to be seen towards the end of Maurice Elvey's biopic of Nelson created in that year.

In dry dock

By 1921 the ship was in a very poor state, and a public Save the Victory campaign was started, with shipping magnate Sir James Caird as a major contributor. On 12 January 1922, her condition was so poor that she would no longer stay afloat, and had to be moved into No. 2 dock at Portsmouth, the oldest dry dock in the world still in use. A naval survey revealed that between a third and a half of her internal fittings required replacement. Her steering equipment had also been removed or destroyed, along with most of her furnishings.

The relocation to No. 2 dock sparked public discussion about Victorys future location. Suggestions in contemporary newspapers included the creation of a floating plinth atop which she could be preserved as a monument, either in Portsmouth or adjacent to the Royal Naval College, Greenwich. Others proposed a berth beside Cleopatra's Needle on the Thames, or as land-based structure in Trafalgar Square. Despite popular support, these options were not seriously entertained by Admiralty. The naval architects who had surveyed the ship reported that she was too damaged to be moved; Admiralty formally adopted their advice and No. 2 dock thereafter became Victorys permanent home.

On 21 October 1922 the Admiral of the Fleet Sir Doveton Sturdee issued a further public plea for "many thousands of pounds" of public donations in The Times. He wrote: "The value of the Victory is no transitory thing. She must be preserved in order that our children’s children may draw from her the same inspiration that we have drawn ourselves, and our fathers before us."

During the initial restoration period from 1922 to 1929, a considerable amount of structural repair work was carried out above the waterline and mainly above the middle deck. On 8 April 1925, Victory was temporarily refloated within Portsmouth's No. 2 dock, to adjust the supporting cradle and so that Victorys waterline would be at the same level with the top of the dry dock. This last refloating of Victory was recorded by Pathé news cameras. In 1928, King George V was able to unveil a tablet celebrating the completion of the work, although restoration and maintenance still continued under the supervision of the Society for Nautical Research. Restoration was suspended during the Second World War, and in 1941, Victory sustained further damage when a 500 lb. bomb dropped by the Luftwaffe broke her keel, as can be seen in Plate 1 in The Anatomy of Nelson's Ships by C. Nepean Longridge (1955), destroyed one of the steel cradles and part of the foremast. On one occasion, German radio propaganda claimed that the ship had been destroyed by a bomb, and the Admiralty had to issue a denial.

In the 1950s, a number of preventive measures were instigated, including the removal of bulkheads to increase airflow and the fumigating of the ship against the deathwatch beetle. The following decade saw the replacement of much of the decayed oak with oily hardwoods such as teak and Iroko, which were believed to be more resistant to fungus and pests. The decision to restore Victory to her Battle of Trafalgar configuration was taken in 1920, but the need to undertake these important repairs meant this was not achieved until 2005, in time for the Trafalgar 200 celebrations. Victorys fore topsail was severely damaged during the Battle of Trafalgar, perforated by upwards of 90 cannonballs and other projectiles. It was replaced after the battle, but was preserved and eventually displayed in the Royal Naval Museum.

21st century
He met Constitutions commanding officer, Commander William A. Bullard III, and discussed the possibility of arranging an exchange programme between the two ships.

Listed as part of the National Historic Fleet, Victory has been the flagship of the First Sea Lord since October 2012. Prior to this, she was the flagship of the Second Sea Lord. She is the oldest commissioned warship in the world and attracts around 350,000 visitors per year in her role as a museum ship. The current and 101st commanding officer is Lieutenant Commander Brian Smith, who assumed command in May 2015.

In December 2011, Defence Equipment and Support awarded an initial five-year project management contract to BAE Systems, with an option to extend to ten years. The restoration is worth £16 million over the life of the contract and will include work to the masts and rigging, replacement side planking, and the addition of fire control measures. It is expected to be the most extensive refit since the ship returned from Trafalgar. In her current state she has no upper masts and minimum rigging. It is expected that it will be over 12 years before these are replaced.

Since this contract was placed, the most significant change has been on 5 March 2012, when ownership of the ship was transferred from the Ministry of Defence to a dedicated HMS Victory Preservation Trust, established as part of the National Museum of the Royal Navy. According to the Royal Navy website, the move was "heralded by the announcement of a £25 million capital grant to support the new Trust by the Gosling Foundation—a donation which has been matched by a further £25 million from the MOD".

Victory has also undergone emergency repair works to prevent the hull decaying and sagging. The hull had been moving at a rate of half a centimetre each year, about 20 cm over the last 40 years. To combat this, a new prop system was installed over a period of three years from 2018 to 2021, which allows for precise readings of the stresses on the hull and a more even distribution of the stress, which will help preserve the ship. The ship will benefit from a £35 million restoration project, utilising Scottish elm and oak trees as wood for the restoration project. As part of this, the lower mainmast was removed in 2021 for conservation, in addition to analysis, to assess whether the other two masts will require the same conservation work.

Admirals who have hoisted their flag in Victory
Over the two centuries since Victorys launch, numerous admirals have hoisted their flag in her:

See also

 Tenants Harbor Light in Maine, US, which contains a replica of Lord Nelson's cabin

Notes

References

Sources

 
 
 
 
 Lavery, Brian (2003) The Ship of the Line Volume 1: The development of the battlefleet 1650–1850. Conway Maritime Press. .

External links

 HMS Victory Official website
 HMS Victory 
 Illustrated article about HMS Victory.

 

1765 ships
Ships built in Chatham
Horatio Nelson
Maritime incidents in April 1854
Individual sailing vessels
Museum ships in the United Kingdom
Museums in Portsmouth
Ships and vessels of the National Historic Fleet
Naval museums in England
Ships of the line of the Royal Navy
Tall ships of the United Kingdom